Tanwen is a railway station on the Taiwan Railways Administration West Coast line (Coastal line) located in Zaoqiao Township, Miaoli County, Taiwan.

Around the station
 Yu Da University

See also
 List of railway stations in Taiwan

References

External links

1922 establishments in Taiwan
Railway stations in Miaoli County
Railway stations opened in 1922
Railway stations served by Taiwan Railways Administration